Popokabaka Airport  is an airstrip serving the city of Popokabaka in Kwango Province, Democratic Republic of the Congo.

See also
 Transport in the Democratic Republic of the Congo
 List of airports in the Democratic Republic of the Congo

References

External links
 Popokabaka
 HERE Maps - Popokabaka
 OurAirports - Popokabaka

Airports in Kwango